Il Piccolo Ranger (i.e. "The Little Ranger") is an Italian comic book series centered on Kit Teller, a character created in 1958 by 
writer Andrea Lavezzolo in tandem with illustrator Francesco Gamba and later developed by numerous authors; they were published in Italy by Edizioni Audace in the striped format in the series of the same name and later in a new series in the Bonelli format published from 1963 to 1985. The character belongs to a group of teenage heroes very popular in the fifties and sixties, such as Captain Miki, the Little Sheriff and others, wanted so young to facilitate their identification with potential young buyers, that being their peers, they could reflect themselves in the protagonists of comic stories. The series presents its own originality, giving life to a long and engaging comic epic with both tragic and humorous tones among the most successful of the western genre of the period. The series was also published in France, the former Yugoslavia (now in Slovenia, Croatia, Bosnia and Herzegovina and Serbia), Turkey, Greece, Spain and Brazil.

A traditional western series addressed to a young audience, it debuted in 1958 and was published until 1985. Until 1963, Il Piccolo Ranger comic books also featured in their appendix episodic stories featuring other characters, including works by Hugo Pratt, Guido Nolitta and Dino Battaglia. It was released fortnightly until 1971, then monthly until its cancellation. Between 1995 and 1996 a collection series in 13 paperback volumes was published in a limited edition by Editrice Dardo.

Biography
Kit Teller is the son of Mary Worth and Ted Moses Teller who emigrate from Wales in search of fortune to the United States where, once they arrive, they venture into the wild frontier territories in search of a job. During this trip, on the border between Missouri and Illinois, Kit was born in 1861. Eight months after Kit's birth, his mother died and little Kit fell ill. Saved by the Indians of the Red Bison tribe, Kit and his father stay with the Indians for almost a year and then leave to join the rangers and send Kit to a college in the east. Moses becomes a ranger and obtains permission from the commander to keep the little Kit at the fort until the child reaches reach college age. The Little Ranger series starts from this moment. Kit's father during a mission deserted and disappeared going to live with the Indians and for this reason he is considered a traitor. The fort's rangers would like to keep the fact from little Kit that is well-liked anyway. The Little Ranger lives his adventures in a wild land facing outlaws, ferocious Indians but also wise reptiles, extraterrestrials or medieval warriors arrived who knows how in the new world. Among the characters he meets, perhaps the most unusual are two Mormons, Italian-American vegetarians: SATURNINO and SALVATORE. They are expert of every art and science, endowed with strange powers. Among other things, they talk to animals, in a way not unlike what happens in the pages of the Tarzanesque Akim. They warn the two Tellers, father and son, to beware of the water on full moon nights. Such a warning will save them from several ambushes. At the end of each adventure, the young ranger finds his friends within the reassuring walls of the ranger fort. Among them the fiancée Claretta Morning, the maternal vivander of the strong Rosa Morning, mother of Claretta, the drunkard Brandy Jim, the Chinese cook and washerman Cin Lao, the sergeant O'Hara, Teeth Bill, Frankie Bellevan, Annie Four guns, Ibrahim Bamboula.

Editorial history
The character made his debut in the Collana Audace of the homonymous publishing house by Gian Luigi Bonelli in the classic striped format published in seven series published from 15 June 1958 to 25 April 1971 for a total of 328 issues. The screenplays are by Andrea Lavezzolo and, to a lesser extent, by Guido Nolitta while the drawings are by Francesco Gamba and Birago Balzano. Subsequently, with the books not sold, the publisher re-proposed the Little Ranger series in a total of 69 collections, starting from n. 11 of the series Supplement to the Audace series. The collections do not have a periodicity and the price is 100 lire for the first volumes and 120 for the remaining issues. From 1963 the stories proposed in the strip format in the Audace series were reprinted in the Bonelli format in the series Gli albi del cowboy – Nuova serie up to page 55 of n. 89 when unpublished stories of the character began to be published; the publication ended after 255 issues in February 1985 in which Kit, Frankie and their friends, finished their years with the Rangers uniform, retired to the countryside and began a new life as ranchers. The merit of the longevity of the series, however, must also be attributed to those who continued the work of Andrea Lavezzolo as Decio Canzio who, while maintaining the spirit of the series, made the narrative more agile, updating it to the changing times or like Giorgio Pezzin, Marcello Toninelli and the If Staff; note that Guido Nolitta wrote the last adventure of the series.

An unpublished self-contained episode entitled "Secret document" was published as an appendix to n. 99 of Commander Mark in the Herald Series. In May 1992, a 148-page special issue was published entitled "The return of the Rangers" written by Mauro Boselli and drawn by Francesco Gamba. Finally, in 2006, the Editoriale Mercury published a new unpublished story entitled "Zoltan the Magician", written by Ermes Senzò and drawn by Luigi Merati. Starting from February 2012, the Little Ranger is reprinted in an edition for newsstands by If Edizioni.

List of albums of the series "The books of the cowboy – New series"

See also
Other comics series created by Andrea Lavezzolo:
Gim Toro (1946–1951) 
Tony Falco (1948–1949)
Geky Dor (1949–1950)
Kinowa (1950–1961)

References

External links
 Piccolo Ranger – Bonelli official site

Italian comics titles
1958 establishments in Italy
1985 disestablishments in Italy
Defunct comics
Comics magazines published in Italy
Western (genre) comics
Fictional adolescents